Hamza el Wasti is a Moroccan professional footballer who plays as a forward.

References

External links
 
 
 
 
 

1995 births
Living people
Moroccan footballers
Association football forwards
Wydad AC players
SCC Mohammédia players